Col. John Tayloe I (February 15, 1688November 15, 1747) was one of the richest plantation owners and businessmen in Virginia for his generation. Considered to be the chief architect of the family fortune, he was known as the "Hon. Colonel of the Old House". The Tayloe family of Richmond County, Virginia, including John Tayloe I, his son, John Tayloe II, and grandson, John Tayloe III, exemplified gentry entrepreneurship.

Early years

Born into the third generation of a British Colonial Family, his father was the Colonel William Tayloe (the nephew) (1645–1710) formerly of Gloucester, England; who emigrated to the Colony of Virginia in the 17th century and took up land in Lancaster & Richmond Counties in 1650; he was the progenitor of the Tayloe's of "Mount Airy." In 1685, William married Anne (1664–1694), daughter of Honorable Henry Corbin (colonist) (circa 1629–1676) and Alice (Eltonhead) Corbin, of "Buckingham House", in Middlesex County. His siblings included Elizabeth (born 1686), and William (1694–1770). He inherited "Tayloe's Quarters," also known as "Mount Airy," from his father. The plantation home was known as “The Old House.”

John Tayloe I accumulated a vast estate and was a liberal supporter of the Established Church. He was a Burgess in 1710, 1728 and 1730.

Career
On February 7, 1710, Mr. John Tayloe was granted administration of the estate of his father, Colonel William Tayloe, late of Richmond County, deceased. In 1711 Francis Yeates, of Richmond County, was allowed by Act of Assembly to convey certain lands to John Tayloe, Gent. Tayloe served as High Sheriff of Richmond County and was in command of the county militia in 1713 at age 26, he was an influential member of the King's Council in 1732. By April 6, 1715, John Tarpley, Edward Barrow, Nicholas Smith, William Thornton son of the immigrant, John Tayloe and Richard Taliaferro were justices, Richmond County. A third-generation plantation owner from the Tayloe family of entrepreneurs. He acquired large holdings, 3,000 acres, known as Nanjemoy in Charles County, Maryland, in Essex County, Virginia Gwynnfield and in Prince William County, Virginia, in 1734 5,000 acres called Neabsco, not far from the present day Quantico or Dumfries, where he operated the Neabsco Iron Works, which passed to his son, John Tayloe II in 1747 upon his death. In 1730 he was a member of the House of Burgesses, became a member of Colonial Council in 1732 and later the King's Council. In 1740 the Old House built by his father was destroyed by fire. He built a larger house at Mt. Airy which was destroyed by fire in 1758, after which the neo-Palladian Villa which still stands was built.

The Bristol Iron Works, near to the J-64 Virginia Historical Marker on Route 3 below Rollins Fork, was located along the Rappahannock River across from Horse Head Point. The works were overseen by John King and Company from Bristol, England and established in 1721 by John Lomax, John Tayloe I, and Associates, for the purposes of mining, smelting, and trading. The iron works were in operation in 1729 and later.

Politically, Tayloe was well-connected which he used to exploit his business interests to their full potential. In 1738, he convinced the Governor's Council of Virginia to "relieve himself and other adventurers in Iron Mines from port duties on iron ore imported from Maryland." He held over 320 slaves on the Northern Neck and in the Rappahannock River area, tending tobacco and other crops, toiling in ironworks, or working around the home as domestics, gardeners, or carpenters. He held large holdings in Charles County, Maryland, and in Essex and Prince William counties, Virginia.

The Neabsco Iron Works (alternates: Neabsco Company; Neabsco Iron Foundry) was located in Woodbridge, Virginia. After abandoning the Bristol Iron Works, John Tayloe I established the Neabsco Iron Foundry around 1737. The business became a multifaceted antebellum industrial plantation. Its activities included farming, leatherworking, milling, shipbuilding, shoemaking, and smithing, as well as supplying raw materials used as weaponry during the American Revolution. The business grew and expanded with his son, John Tayloe II, when, in 1756, he bought the Occoquan Ironworks company, eventually running it as one business with the Neabsco. 

His son John Tayloe II and his first cousin Colonel Thomas Lee (Virginia colonist) were named executors. He left Tayloe's Quarter, what was to become Mount Airy, to his son John. The will was proved with inventories. He gave to his widow the use of the plantation where he lived, 1200 acres; a large number of slaves, his chariot and six horses, plate and furniture, 1000 pounds sterling, and one-fourth of his stock of horses and cattle. He directs that these bequests are not to bar her from receiving her dower. To each of his two daughters, he gave 2000 pounds sterling from his own estate and 500 pounds a piece in currency money, which had been left them by their grandmother, Mrs. Gwyn. Left to only son John 12,846 acres in Prince William County, all his other estates (most of which were entailed) and all of his slaves and other property not bequeathed to his wife, together with the reversion of what was left her. Left a number of handsome legacies to friends, and a bequest of 300 pounds of currency money of Virginia, 10 cows and a bull to the parish of Lunenburg, in which he lived. The money was to be expended in repairs and necessary improvements to the glebe, and in clothing the naked and feeding the poor of the parish. He also directed that 6 slaves should be bought and placed on the glebe to work for the minister, and with this bequest made a provision that if these negroes were ever treated cruelly by the minister, they should be taken from him, and worked, under the orders of the vestry, for the benefit of the parish.

The inventory of his estate shows that on his plantations in Richmond, Essex, King George, Stafford and Prince William counties, Virginia, and in Maryland, he owned 279 slaves. The apartments in his house, the "Old House" (which preceded Mt. Airy), were "the counting-house," "planter's hall", "the passage", "the green room", "the dining room" in which were a set of Reuben's Gallery of Lunenburg, the "back passage", "Mrs. Tayloe's chamber", the "inner room", the "room under Mrs. Tayloe's", "the great chamber", "Mr. Fauntleroy's room", another "passage", "the room over the green room" and "Slater's closet" which was probably the butler's pantry, as it contained plate valued at 160 pounds sterling. The inventory included a coach with harness for four horses and a chariot with harness for six. The total value of the personal estate in VA was 10,035.10.10 pounds sterling. The personal estate in Maryland, including 40 slaves and the equipment of a large plantation, was not appraised.

Personal life
He married Elizabeth (Gwynn) Lyde (1692–1734), widow of Stephen Lyde, daughter of Major David Gwynn of Gwynnfield, Essex County, and Katherine Griffin. They resided at 'The Old House' in Richmond County, 2 miles from Mount Airy. The couple had four children: William Tayloe (1716–1726), who died at age 9, twins named John and Elizabeth (born 28 May 1721), who later married John Wormeley, and a daughter named Ann Corbin Tayloe, born 25 August 1723, who later married Mann Page II, mother of Mann Page and stepmother to John Page (Virginia politician).

References

1688 births
1747 deaths
American planters
American militia officers
Businesspeople from Virginia
People from Richmond County, Virginia
Tayloe family of Virginia
House of Burgesses members
Virginia sheriffs
American slave owners